X.3 is an ITU-T standard indicating what functions are to be performed by a Packet Assembler/Disassembler (PAD) when connecting character-mode data terminal equipment (DTE), such as a computer terminal, to a packet switched network such as an X.25 network, and specifying the parameters that control this operation.

The following is list of X.3 parameters associated with a PAD:
1 PAD recall using a character
2 Echo
3 Selection of data forwarding character
4 Selection of idle timer delay
5 Ancillary device control
6 Control of PAD service signals
7 Operation on receipt of break signal
8 Discard output
9 Padding after carriage return
10 Line folding
11 DTE speed
12 Flow control of the PAD
13 Linefeed insertion after carriage return
14 Padding after linefeed
15 Editing
16 Character delete
17 Line delete
18 Line display
19 Editing PAD service signals
20 Echo mask
21 Parity treatment
22 Page wait

References

External links
X.3 standard at ITU site
Cisco Web Page Definition of X.3 parameters

Networking standards
X.25